K: A History of Baseball in Ten Pitches is a 2019 book by The New York Times sportswriter Tyler Kepner that examines the history of baseball.

Synopsis 
The book recounts the history of baseball through anecdotes about iconic pitches and interviews with pitchers such as Steve Carlton, J. R. Richard and Bob Gibson and Nolan Ryan. It also describes the mechanics of pitching, and its centrality to the game of baseball.

Reception 
The book was generally received, with praise for its humor and analysis of the sport. It has seven "rave" reviews, one "positive" review, and two "mixed" reviews, according to review aggregator Book Marks.

Baseball writer Paul Dickson wrote that the book was "well-written, anecdote rich and filled with seldom-shared insights by players." Steven V. Roberts in a review for The Washington Post was less positive, writing that it "lacks a compelling narrative and well-developed characters" and would not appeal to casual fans of the sport.

References

2019 non-fiction books
English-language books
Doubleday (publisher) books
Baseball books